Eugen Weisz (January 3, 1886 – January 3, 1954) was an American painter. His work was part of the painting event in the art competition at the 1928 Summer Olympics.

References

1886 births
1954 deaths
20th-century American painters
American male painters
Olympic competitors in art competitions
People from Šurany
20th-century American male artists